Bethsabée is a 1947 French drama film directed by Léonide Moguy and starring Danielle Darrieux, Georges Marchal and Jean Murat. It is also known by the alternative title of Le Deserter. It is based on a novel by Pierre Benoît, set in French Morocco. The title is a reference to the biblical story of Bathsheba.

It was shot at the Billancourt Studios in Paris. The film's sets were designed by the art directors Henri Ménessier and René Renoux.

Cast
 Danielle Darrieux as Arabella Delvert, A Woman Who Came to Join Her Lover In Morocco
 Georges Marchal as Captain Georges Dubreuil, The Head of A Spahis Post and Arabella's Lover
 Jean Murat as Colonel de Cervière
 Paul Meurisse as Captain Lucien Sommervill, Arabella's Ex-Lover
 Pierre-Louis as Lieutenant Testard
 Olivier Darrieux as The Driver
 Nicolas Vogel as The Adjutant
 Robert Darène as The Major
 Andrée Clément as Evelyne de Cerviere, The Colonel's Daughter

References

Bibliography
 Goble, Alan. The Complete Index to Literary Sources in Film. Walter de Gruyter, 1999.

External links

Besthabee at Unifrance
Bethsabee at BFI

1947 films
Films directed by Léonide Moguy
French drama films
1940s French-language films
1947 drama films
Films based on French novels
Films shot at Billancourt Studios
Films set in Morocco
French black-and-white films
Films scored by Joseph Kosma
1940s French films